Fair Oak and Horton Heath is a civil parish within the Borough of Eastleigh in Hampshire, England. The parish contains the villages of Fair Oak and Horton Heath. In 2011 it had a population of 10,212.

History 
On 28 July 1983 it was renamed from "Fair Oak" to "Fair Oak and Horton Heath".

Fair Oak

Horton Heath

References 

Civil parishes in Hampshire
Borough of Eastleigh